Pine Mountain Lake Airport , formerly Q68, is a public airport located three miles (4.8 km) northeast of Groveland, serving Tuolumne County, California, United States. It is used mostly for general aviation, and has public access. The airport is part of the Pine Mountain Lake community.

Facilities 
Pine Mountain Lake Airport covers 52 acres and has one runway:

 Runway 9/27: 3,625 x 50 ft (1,105 x 15 m), surface: asphalt
 Fuel - 24-hour self-service
 Parking tie-downs
 Air-frame service
 Power-plant service

Cautions to pilots: "Be alert, deer on and in vicinity of airport especially Nov.-Apr."

Past airline service 

The Pine Mountain Lake Airport was served during the late 1970s and early 1980s by Yosemite Airlines, a commuter air carrier based in Columbia, CA which operated small Cessna prop aircraft with scheduled passenger flights between the airport and San Francisco International Airport (SFO), Oakland International Airport (OAK) and Sacramento International Airport (SMF).  The airport was listed in the Official Airline Guide (OAG) as "Yosemite National Park" although Yosemite Valley in the national park is located approximately 46 miles east of the airfield via California State Route 120.

References

External links 
 Pine Mountain Lake Aviation Association
 Webcams at E45

Airports in Tuolumne County, California
Residential airparks